Harold "Lally" Stott (16 January 1945 – 6 June 1977) was a British singer-songwriter and musician who wrote the song "Chirpy Chirpy Cheep Cheep" which became a UK number one hit for the Scottish band Middle of the Road in 1971, and charting at number 20 in the U.S. and number 41 in the UK the same year for Mac and Katie Kissoon.

Life and career
Stott was born in Prescot, Lancashire, in 1945. He spent several years in Italy, as vocalist and front-man of the 1960s Liverpool beat band The Motowns. He wrote the song "Chirpy Chirpy Cheep Cheep" and released his version in September 1970 on the Philips label. Scottish pop band Middle of the Road later released their version which went on to top the UK Singles Chart in 1971 for five weeks. Stott's own version of the song was a hit in Italy, France and the Netherlands, went to number one in Australia for one week and charted at number 92 on the U.S. Billboard Hot 100. The song has been covered in many languages, including Vietnamese, Korean, Estonian, Swedish, French, Finnish, Spanish, Dutch and German.

Stott released other minor hits, "Jakaranda" and "Love Is Free, Love Is Blind, Love Is Good". He also wrote "My Summer Song" which was recorded by Engelbert Humperdinck, Jerry Reed, and Jigsaw. Stott co-wrote "Bottoms Up", "Samson and Delilah", "Sacramento", "Tweedle Dee, Tweedle Dum" and other songs for Middle of the Road, all reaching the top 10 in several European countries between 1971 and 1973.

Under his own name Stott released, with moderate success, "Good Wishes, Good Kisses" (the theme song of the Italian TV miniseries "Tenente Sheridan - La donna di picche") and "Sweet Meeny".

Stott was killed aged 32 in a traffic accident in 1977 while riding a small commuter bike close to his hometown of Prescot. He is buried in St. Ann's Churchyard, Rainhill.

References

1945 births
1977 deaths
Road incident deaths in England
English male singer-songwriters
Beat musicians
People from Prescot
20th-century British musicians
20th-century English male writers
20th-century British male singers